Chesapeake High School (CHS), commonly referred to locals as The Peake, is a public high school in Chesapeake, Ohio, United States.

References

External links 
 

High schools in Lawrence County, Ohio
Public high schools in Ohio